Leonardo Fabio Castro Méndez (born 14 June 1992) is a Colombian professional footballer who plays as forward for Millonarios FC.

Early life 
Castro was born in El Tambo, Cauca, but moved to Pereira with his family at age 3. Growing up, he used to work in a waste management company and played recreational football games in order to make enough money to support his family. Before joining Deportivo Pereira, Castro had been rejected by Barranquilla F.C., Envigado F.C., and La Equidad.

Career
Castro began his career with Deportivo Pereira of the Categoría Primera B in 2014. In 2016, he moved to Independiente Medellín, where he was part of the squad that won the 2016 Apertura and the Copa Colombia in 2019 and 2020.

Honours

Independiente Medellín 

 Categoría Primera A: 2016 Apertura
 Copa Colombia: 2019, 2020

References

External links 
 

1992 births
Living people
Colombian footballers
Association football forwards
Categoría Primera A players
Categoría Primera B players
Deportivo Pereira footballers
Independiente Medellín footballers
Sportspeople from Cauca Department